Christian Morecraft (born September 8, 1986) is an American mixed martial artist, who fought in the UFC in the heavyweight division.

Background
Morecraft is from Washington D.C. and went to an MMA school before turning pro in 2008. He also worked in construction before becoming a professional fighter.

Mixed martial arts career

Ultimate Fighting Championship
Morecraft made his UFC debut on August 7, 2010 at UFC 117 taking on 6'11 Stefan Struve. In round one, Morecraft took Struve down and dominated him with vicious ground and pound, but was unable to gain a stoppage. In round two, Struve came out quickly and landed hard punches on Morecraft, TKO'ing him in just 22 seconds.

Morecraft fought Sean McCorkle on March 26, 2011 at UFC Fight Night 24 for his second UFC appearance. After a closely contested first round, Morecraft dominated in the second. However, Morecraft then threw an illegal low blow, causing the referee to stop the action to allow McCorkle time to recover. Morecraft went on to win the fight after choking McCorkle unconscious from a standing guillotine choke.

Morecraft faced Matt Mitrione on June 26, 2011 at UFC on Versus 4 for his third UFC match.  Mitrione outworked Morecraft throughout the entire fight before knocking him out late in the second round.

Morecraft faced Pat Barry on January 20, 2012 at UFC on FX: Guillard vs. Miller. Despite taking down Barry and locking up an armbar early in round one, he was unable to submit his opponent and lost the fight via KO. With Morecraft's performance, he was awarded Fight of the Night honors along with Barry.

Morecraft announced on March 26, 2013 that he is leaving the fight business.
After some time off Morecraft returned to fighting on September 14 at CFX 23, where he won the bout via armbar.

Personal life

Arrest
On the evening of September 1, 2012 Morecraft was pulled over by officers from the Barnstable (Mass.) Police Department. He subsequently was arrested on suspicion of operating a motor vehicle while under the influence of alcohol, driving so as to endanger and speeding and driving with no license in possession.

Championships and accomplishments

Mixed martial arts
Ultimate Fighting Championship
Fight of the Night (One time) vs. Pat Barry 
Reality Fighting
Reality Fighting Heavyweight Title (One time)
Cage Fighting Xtreme
Cage Fighting Xtreme Heavyweight Title (One time)

Mixed martial arts record

|-
|Win
|align=center|8–3
|Randy Smith
|Submission (armbar)
|CFX 23: Summer Slam
|
|align=center|1
|align=center|1:28
|Plymouth, Massachusetts, United States
|
|-
|Loss
|align=center|7–3
|Pat Barry
|KO (punches)
|UFC on FX: Guillard vs. Miller
|
|align=center|1
|align=center|3:38
|Nashville, Tennessee, United States
|
|-
|Loss
|align=center|7–2
|Matt Mitrione
|KO (punches)
|UFC Live: Kongo vs. Barry
|
|align=center|2
|align=center|4:28
|Pittsburgh, Pennsylvania, United States
|
|-
|Win
|align=center|7–1
|Sean McCorkle
|Technical Submission (standing guillotine choke)
|UFC Fight Night: Nogueira vs. Davis
|
|align=center|2
|align=center|4:10
|Seattle, Washington, United States
|
|-
|Loss
|align=center|6–1
|Stefan Struve
|KO (punches)
|UFC 117
|
|align=center|2
|align=center|0:22
|Oakland, California, United States
|
|-
|Win
|align=center|6–0
|Lee Beane
|TKO (submission to punches)
|CFX 9: Finally
|
|align=center|1
|align=center|2:40
|Plymouth, Massachusetts, United States
|
|-
|Win
|align=center|5–0
|Jason Dolloff
|TKO (punches)
|CFX 8: Rumble in the Jungle 3
|
|align=center|1
|align=center|0:40
|Plymouth, Massachusetts, United States
|
|-
|Win
|align=center|4–0
|Josh Diekmann
|Submission (rear-naked choke)
|CFX 6: Rumble in the Jungle 2
|
|align=center|1
|align=center|0:56
|Plymouth, Massachusetts, United States
|
|-
|Win
|align=center|3–0
|Eric Foley
|Submission (armbar)
|Reality Fighting-Showdown
|
|align=center|1
|align=center|1:10
|Plymouth, Massachusetts, United States
|
|-
|Win
|align=center|2–0
|Eric Foley
|KO (punches)
|Reality Fighting-Final Conflict
|
|align=center|1
|align=center|2:25
|Plymouth, Massachusetts, United States
|
|-
|Win
|align=center|1–0
|John Curtis
|TKO (punches)
|Reality Fighting-Nightmare
|
|align=center|1
|align=center|0:41
|Plymouth, Massachusetts, United States
|

See also
 List of current UFC fighters
 List of male mixed martial artists

References

External links

Official UFC Profile

Living people
American male mixed martial artists
Heavyweight mixed martial artists
Sportspeople from Washington, D.C.
1986 births
Ultimate Fighting Championship male fighters